Karl Struss, A.S.C. (November 30, 1886 – December 15, 1981) was an American photographer and a cinematographer of the 1900s through the 1950s. He was also one of the earliest pioneers of 3-D films. While he mostly worked on films, such as F.W. Murnau's Sunrise: A Song of Two Humans and Charlie Chaplin's The Great Dictator and Limelight, he was also one of the cinematographers for the television series Broken Arrow and photographed 19 episodes of My Friend Flicka.

Life and career
Karl Struss was born in New York City in 1886. After an illness in high school, Karl's father, Henry, removed his son from school and placed him as a labor operator at Seybel & Struss bonnet wire factory. He began to develop an interest in photography, experimenting with an 8x10 camera, and beginning in 1908, attended Clarence H. White's evening art photography course at Teachers College at Columbia University, concluding his studies in 1912. Early in his studies, he explored the properties of camera lenses and eventually invented, in 1909, what he attempted to patent as the Struss Pictorial Lens, a soft-focus lens. This lens was considered popular with pictorial photographers of the time. The Struss Pictorial lens was the first soft-focus lens introduced into the motion picture industry, in 1916.

Initially, Struss gained attention in the photo world when 12 of his pictorial works were chosen by Alfred Stieglitz for the Albright Art Gallery International Exhibition of Pictorial Photography in 1910. This was the final exhibition of the Photo-Secession, an organization that promoted photography as fine art. Struss's reputation was solidified by his inclusion in the exhibition "What the Camera Does in the Hand of the Artist" at the Newark Art Museum, held in April 1911, and an invitation by the Teacher's College for Struss to organize a one-person exhibition of his views of New York City as well as to teach White's course in the summer of 1912 while White was away. Struss was invited by Stieglitz to join the Photo-Secession in 1912, which led to the publication of Struss's photographs in the group's magazine Camera Work. In 1913, Struss, in collaboration with Edward Dickson, Clarence White, Alvin Langdon Coburn, and Paul Anderson, began their own publication, Platinum Print. In 1914, he resigned his position at the family business and asserted his identity as a professional photographer by assuming Clarence White's former studio space in June of that year 

At the suggestion of Coburn, Struss submitted prints to the American Invitational Section of the annual exhibition of the Royal Photographic Society in London, initiating an exhibiting practice he would continue into the 1920s. He also participated in numerous exhibitions organized by photography clubs and other associations, including the Pittsburgh Salon of National Photographic Art and the annual photography display organized by the Philadelphia department store Wanamaker's. As Struss continued his exhibitions and specialized commissions, he produced commercial photography for magazines, including Vogue, Vanity Fair, and Harper's Bazaar. (However, he was quick to insist that he was not doing fashion photography.) His photographic practice was interrupted by World War I. In 1917, he registered for the draft and then enlisted with the aim of fulfilling his military service through photography. He trained to teach aerial photography, but an investigation into Struss's German affiliations launched by the Military Intelligence Department led to his demotion from the rank of sergeant to private; after a period in confinement in Ithaca, New York, where he had originally gone to teach in the new School of Military Aeronautics, he was transferred to Fort Leavenworth to serve as a prison guard and then as a file clerk. In the latter role, he took up photography again, documenting the prisoners. Near the close of the war, in an attempt to clear his record of rumors of anti-Americanism, he applied and was accepted into Officer's Training Camp at the rank of corporal. While Struss eventually received an honorable discharge, he likely was disinclined to resume his former roles in New York because of the fracturing of many of his professional relationships in the wake of the military investigation.

In 1919, after his discharge, he moved to Los Angeles and signed with Cecil B. DeMille as a cameraman, initially for the film For Better, For Worse, starring Gloria Swanson, followed by another Swanson film, Male and Female, and leading to a two-year contract with the studio. In early 1921, he married Ethel Wall, who helped to support him in his photographic work independent of the film studios, which included pictorial views set in California. In the 1920s, Struss worked on such films as Ben-Hur and F.W. Murnau's Sunrise: A Song of Two Humans. In 1927, he contracted with United Artists, where he worked with D.W. Griffith on films such as Drums of Love and filmed Mary Pickford's first sound film, Coquette. He continued his experimental work with camera technology, developing the "Lupe Light" and a new bracket system for the Bell & Howell camera.

From 1931 through 1945, Struss worked as a cameraman for Paramount, where he worked on a variety of material, including films featuring Mae West, Bing Crosby, and Dorothy Lamour. Struss also aimed to shape the field through publishing: for example, in 1934, he wrote "Photographic Modernism and the Cinematographer" for American Cinematographer. Struss was admitted to the American Society of Cinematographers and was a founding member of the Academy of Motion Picture Arts. In 1949, while working as a freelancer, he began his work in "stereo cinematography", becoming one of the early proponents of that art form. Unfortunately, he did most of his 3-D film work in Italy, and none of his films were released in 3-D in the United States.

Struss's photographic archive of exhibition prints, film stills, negatives, and papers (3 linear feet of materials) is available at the Amon Carter Museum of American Art, located in Fort Worth, Texas.

Aside from his work as a photographer and cinematographer, Struss had a keen interest in philately with a particular focus on the first transpacific airmail flights, making commemorative covers for both the initial November 22, 1935 airmail flight from San Francisco to Honolulu and on to Manila and for the first flights on the extension of the service, from Manila to Hong Kong and Macau, starting April 1937. These signed covers are on his personal stationery showing his address at the time as 1343 N. Orange Grove Ave., in Hollywood (see illustration).

Awards
In his career, Struss was nominated for an Academy Award for Best Cinematography four times. The first time, and the only time he won, was for F.W. Murnau's Sunrise: A Song of Two Humans in 1929, sharing that award with Charles Rosher. He was nominated again in 1932 for Dr. Jekyll and Mr. Hyde, in 1934 for The Sign of the Cross, and in 1942 for Aloma of the South Seas with Wilfred M. Cline, A.S.C. and William E. Snyder, A.S.C.

Selected filmography

 Forbidden Fruit (1921) with Agnes Ayres 
 Saturday Night (1922) with Conrad Nagel and Leatrice Joy
 Thorns and Orange Blossoms (1922)
 Rich Men's Wives (1922)
 Mothers-in-Law (1923)
 Poor Men's Wives (1923)
 The Legend of Hollywood (1924)
 Ben-Hur (1925) with Ramon Navarro 
 Sunrise: A Song of Two Humans (1927) with Janet Gaynor
 The Battle of the Sexes (1928) with Jean Hersholt 
 Lady of the Pavements (1929) with Lupe Vélez
 Coquette (1929) with Mary Pickford
 The Taming of the Shrew (1929) with Douglas Fairbanks and Mary Pickford
 Abraham Lincoln (1930) with Walter Huston 
 Skippy (1931) with Jackie Cooper
 Dr. Jekyll and Mr. Hyde (1931) with Fredric March and Miriam Hopkins
 The Sign of the Cross (1932) with Fredric March and Charles Laughton 
 Island of Lost Souls (1932) with Charles Laughton and Bela Lugosi
 The Story of Temple Drake (1933) with Miriam Hopkins 
 One Sunday Afternoon (1933) with Gary Cooper and Fay Wray
 Four Frightened People (1934) with Claudette Colbert
 Belle of the Nineties (1934) with Mae West
 The Pursuit of Happiness (1934) with Francis Lederer and Joan Bennett
 Goin' to Town (1935) with Mae West
 Every Day's a Holiday (1937) with Mae West
 Zenobia (1939) with Oliver Hardy and Harry Langdon
 Gone with the Wind (1939) with Clark Gable and Vivien Leigh
 The Great Dictator (1940) with Charles Chaplin and Paulette Goddard
 Journey into Fear (1943) with Orson Welles and Joseph Cotten
 Frenchman's Creek (1944) with Joan Fontaine
 Wonder Man (1945) with Danny Kaye
 Suspense (1946) with Belita and Barry Sullivan 
 Heaven Only Knows (1947) with Robert Cummings
 Rocketship X-M  (1950) with Lloyd Bridges and Osa Massen
 The Return of Jesse James (1950) with John Ireland and Ann Dvorak
 Lady Possessed (1952) with James Mason
 Limelight (1952) with Charles Chaplin and Buster Keaton
 Mohawk (1956), with Scott Brady and Neville Brand 
 Kronos (1957), with Jeff Morrow and Barbara Lawrence
 The Fly (1958) with Vincent Price

References

External links

Biography on 3D Gear website

Karl Struss in 1912(portrait by Clarence H. White)
Karl Struss 1912(by Clarence H. White, courtesy the Amer.Society of Cinematographers)

American cinematographers
1886 births
1981 deaths
Artists from Los Angeles
Artists from New York City
Best Cinematographer Academy Award winners
Photographers from California
Teachers College, Columbia University alumni
20th-century American photographers
Burials at Woodlawn Cemetery (Bronx, New York)